Lech Ordon (24 November 1928, Poznań – 21 October 2017, Warsaw) was a Polish actor.

In 1948, he graduated from The Aleksander Zelwerowicz National Academy of Dramatic Art in Warsaw, at the time located in Łódź. He was known for his roles in Letters to Santa, and in Mister Blot's Academy.

In December 2008, on the occasion of 90th anniversary of the Polish Union of Stage Actors, he was awarded the Medal for Merit to Culture – Gloria Artis.

Death
Ordon died on 21 October 2017 at the age of 88.

Filmography
 A Matter to Settle (1953)
 Warsaw Premiere (1961)

References

External links

1928 births
2017 deaths
Actors from Poznań
Recipients of the Medal for Merit to Culture – Gloria Artis
Polish male film actors